Angus Learmond (7 February 1915 – 3 November 1997) was a Guyanese cricketer. He played in four first-class matches for British Guiana from 1933 to 1937.

See also
 List of Guyanese representative cricketers

References

External links
 

1915 births
1997 deaths
Guyanese cricketers
Guyana cricketers
Sportspeople from Georgetown, Guyana